Kingsford Historic District is a national historic district located at Oswego, Oswego County, New York.  It encompasses 76 contributing buildings in a predominantly residential section of Oswego.  It developed between about 1830 and 1910, and includes notable examples of Italianate, Romanesque Revival, Colonial Revival, and Tudor Revival style architecture. Located in the district is the separately listed Kingsford House. Other notable buildings include the former St. Matthew's Lutheran Church (1888), 40 West Oneida Street (1898) designed by Claude Fayette Bragdon, the former Public School #3 (1860s), and West Baptist Church (1867) designed by Andrew Jackson Warner.

It was added to the National Register of Historic Places in 2014.

References

Historic districts on the National Register of Historic Places in New York (state)
Greek Revival architecture in New York (state)
Italianate architecture in New York (state)
Romanesque Revival architecture in New York (state)
Tudor Revival architecture in New York (state)
Colonial Revival architecture in New York (state)
Buildings and structures in Oswego County, New York
National Register of Historic Places in Oswego County, New York